Arthur Bowden Askey,  (6 June 1900 – 16 November 1982) was an English comedian and actor. Askey was known for his short stature (5' 2", 1.58 m) and distinctive horn-rimmed glasses, and his playful humour incorporating improvisation and catchphrases including "Hello playmates!", "I thank you" (pronounced "Ay-thang-yaw") and "Before your very eyes".

Askey achieved prominence in the 1930s in the BBC's first radio comedy series Band Waggon and subsequently starred in several Gainsborough Pictures comedy films during the Second World War including Charley's (Big-Hearted) Aunt (1940) and The Ghost Train (1941). His novelty recordings for His Master's Voice include "The Bee Song" (1938), a lasting part of his act. From the 1950s, Askey was a prominent television presence and made regular appearances on the BBC's long-running music hall programme The Good Old Days. Askey was made an OBE in 1969 and a CBE in 1981; he continued to appear frequently on television, radio and the stage until his death in 1982.

Early life and education 
Askey was born at 29 Moses Street, Dingle, Liverpool, the eldest child and only son of Betsy (née Bowden, d. 1949), originally from Knutsford, Cheshire and Samuel Askey (d. 1958), company secretary of Sugar Products of Liverpool. Six months after his birth, the family moved to 90 Rosslyn Street, Liverpool. It was here that a sister, Irene Dorothy, was born. Askey was educated at St. Michael's Council School (1905–11) and the Liverpool Institute for Boys (1911–16).

Career
Askey served in the Royal Welsh Fusiliers in the First World War and performed in army entertainments. This would prove an excellent training ground for his career in show business. After working as a clerk for Liverpool Corporation's Education Department, he was in a touring concert party, the music halls and was in the stage company of Powis Pinder on the Isle of Wight in the early 1930s before he rose to stardom in 1938 through his role in the first regular radio comedy series, Band Waggon on the BBC. Band Waggon began as a variety show, but had been unsuccessful until Askey and his partner, Richard Murdoch, took on a larger role in the writing.

Film roles
During the Second World War Askey starred in several Gainsborough Pictures comedy films, including Band Waggon (1940), based on the radio show; Charley's (Big-Hearted) Aunt (1940); The Ghost Train (1941); I Thank You (1941); Back-Room Boy (1942); King Arthur Was a Gentleman (1942); Miss London Ltd. (1943); Bees in Paradise (1944); The Love Match (1955) and Make Mine a Million (1959). His last film was Rosie Dixon – Night Nurse (1978), starring Debbie Ash.

Television
In the early 1930s, Askey appeared on an early form of BBC television—the spinning disc invented by John Logie Baird that scanned vertically and had only thirty lines. Askey had to be heavily made up for his face to be recognisable at such low resolution. When television became electronic, with 405 horizontal lines, Askey was a regular performer in variety shows. When television returned after the second World War, his first TV series was Before Your Very Eyes! (1952), named after his catchphrase. On 3 May 1956, Askey presented Meet The People, a launch night programme for Granada Television. In 1957 writers Sid Colin and Talbot Rothwell revived the Band Waggon format for Living It Up, a series that reunited Askey and Murdoch after 18 years. He continued to appear frequently on television in the 1970s, such as being a panellist on the ITV talent show New Faces, where his usually sympathetic comments would offset the harsher judgments of fellow judges Tony Hatch and Mickie Most. He also appeared on the comedy panel game Jokers Wild. He made many TV appearances in variety, including BBC TV's long running show, The Good Old Days. His final professional engagement was The Green Tie on the Little Yellow Dog, which was recorded 1982, and broadcast by Channel 4 in 1983.

Radio
In the late 1940s, Askey participated in a BBC radio show called How Do You Do in which listeners could write into the BBC asking for him to come and broadcast a show from their homes, twelve shows were broadcast with Arthur, his daughter Anthea and special guests, as well as a surprise guest each week which was revealed some time throughout the programme. The theme of each show was worked around the occupation of the family from where it was broadcast. This was broadcast on the Light Programme. Only one of the shows was recorded onto acetate discs, which are now held at The British Library. During the 1950s and 1960s, he appeared in many sitcoms, including Love and Kisses, Arthur's Treasured Volumes and The Arthur Askey Show. He was the subject of This Is Your Life on two occasions, in December 1959 when he was surprised by Eamonn Andrews, and in December 1974, when Andrews, dressed as Humpty Dumpty, surprised him on a television show while discussing the art of pantomime. Askey made four appearances on the BBC Radio series Desert Island Discs in 1942, 1955, 1968 and 1980. He shares the record for most appearances on the programme with David Attenborough.

Theatre
Askey appeared in the West End musical Follow the Girls. He also made many stage appearances as a pantomime dame.

Recordings
Askey's recording career included "The Bee Song", which was an integral part of his stage and television act for many years, "The Thing-Ummy Bob" and his theme tune, "Big-Hearted Arthur" (which was also his nickname). In 1941 a song he intended to record, "It's Really Nice to See You Mr Hess" (after Hitler's deputy Rudolf Hess fled to Scotland), was banned by the War Office. A collection of Askey's wartime recordings appear on the CD album Band Waggon/Big Hearted Arthur Goes To War.

Private Eye
Private Eye magazine in the 1970s regularly made the comment that he and the Queen Mother had "never been seen in the same room together", referring to the fact that they were about the same age and height and suggesting that the Queen Mother was Askey in drag.

Honours
Askey was appointed OBE in 1969 and advanced to CBE in 1981.

Personal life
Askey was married to Elizabeth May Swash in 1925 until her death in 1974; he was the father of actress Anthea Askey (1933–1999).

Death
Askey carried on working on his comedy career until just before he was hospitalised in July 1982, owing to poor circulation, which resulted in gangrene and the amputation of both legs.  During his stay as an inpatient he was kept company by Tony Lee at the suggestion of nursing staff. He died in London's St Thomas's Hospital on 16 November 1982 and was cremated at Putney Vale Crematorium.

Filmography

Film

Television

Legacy
Arthur Askey is among other famous names in the Dirk Wears White Sox version of "Friends" by Adam and the Ants.

Paul Whitehouse in The Fast Show played 'Arthur Atkinson' a spoof of Arthur Askey and Max Miller.

See also
 Radio comedy
 Cinema of the United Kingdom
 List of British actors

Notes

References

Bibliography
 Arthur Askey (autobiography). Before Your Very Eyes (London: Woburn Press, 1975) 
 Kurt Ganzl. The Encyclopedia of the Musical Theatre (New York: Shirmer Books, 2001) pp. 75 
 Murphy, Robert. (2005). British Cinema and the Second World War. A&C Black
 Slide, Anthony. I Thank You: The Arthur Askey Story. (Orlando, Florida: BearManor Media, 2020).

External links
 Arthur Askey BFI
 Star Archive: Arthur Askey (1900–1982)
 
 
 Askey and Band Waggon audiobook CD at CD41

1900 births
1982 deaths
Male actors from Liverpool
Burials at Putney Vale Cemetery
Comedians from Liverpool
Commanders of the Order of the British Empire
English comedy musicians
English male film actors
English radio personalities
Comedians from Lancashire
People educated at Liverpool Institute High School for Boys
Music hall performers
20th-century English male actors
20th-century English musicians
English amputees
20th-century English comedians
British male comedy actors
British novelty song performers
Deaths from gangrene
British Army personnel of World War I
Royal Welch Fusiliers soldiers